Taleju Temple is a Hindu temple dedicated to Taleju Bhawani, the royal goddess of the Malla dynasty of Nepal. It was built in 1564 by Mahendra Malla and is located in Hanuman Dhoka, Kathmandu Durbar Square, a UNESCO World Heritage Site. Inside the temple, there is a shire dedicated to  Taleju Bhawani, and Kumari Devi. Taleju Temple is only opened once a year on the occasion of Dashain.

Gallery

References

External links
 

Hindu temples in Kathmandu District
Kathmandu District
Kathmandu Durbar Square
World Heritage Sites in Nepal
16th-century establishments in Nepal
Newa architecture